The 1931 Australian federal election was held in Australia on 19 December 1931. All 75 seats in the House of Representatives and 18 of the 36 seats in the Senate were up for election.

The incumbent first-term Australian Labor Party (ALP) government led by Prime Minister James Scullin was defeated in a landslide by the United Australia Party (UAP) led by Joseph Lyons. To date, this is the last time that a sitting government at federal level has been defeated after a single term.

The election was held at a time of great social and political upheaval, coming at the peak of the Great Depression in Australia. The UAP had only been formed a few months before the election, when Lyons and a few ALP dissidents joined forces with the Nationalist Party and the Australian Party. Although it was dominated by former Nationalists, Lyons became the merged party's leader, with Nationalist leader John Latham as his deputy.

Scullin's position eroded further when five left-wing Labor MPs from New South Wales who supported NSW Premier Jack Lang broke away and moved to the crossbenches in protest of Scullin's economic policy, reducing Scullin to a minority government. Late in 1931, they supported a UAP no-confidence motion and brought down the government. The two Labor factions were decimated; massive vote-splitting left them with only 18 seats between them (14 for the official ALP and four for the Langites).

Prior to the election, it was assumed that the Country Party, led by Earle Page, would hold the balance of power, and Page tentatively agreed to support the UAP if that were the case. The two parties campaigned separately and stood candidates against each other in the House of Representatives, but ran joint tickets in Senate. However, the UAP came up four seats short of a majority. The five MPs from the Emergency Committee of South Australia, which contested the election in that state in place of the UAP and Country Party, joined the UAP party room, giving the UAP enough numbers to form a majority government by two seats. Page was still willing to form a coalition with the Country Party, but negotiations broke down and Lyons decided the UAP would govern by itself. As a result, the First Lyons Ministry was composed solely of UAP members.

Labor spent the next 10 years in opposition; it did not return to power until 1941.

Issues
The election was dominated by the Great Depression in Australia, which was at its height. As the Labor Government had come to office two days before the Wall Street Crash of 1929, it was seen as being responsible for many of the economic and social problems Australia faced, which sparked the historic Australian Labor Party split of 1931 in which Lyons and four other Labor dissidents crossed the floor to the opposition, ultimately merging into the UAP. Although the UAP was seen as an upper- and middle-class conservative party, the presence of ex-Labor MPs allowed the party to project an image of national unity.

By the time the writs were issued, official Labor and Lang Labor were in open warfare, making a UAP victory all but certain. Due to the massive vote splitting brought on by a large number of three-cornered contests, Labor tallied its lowest primary vote since Federation, while the two Labor factions, official Labor and Lang Labor, won only 18 seats between them, with official Labor losing a record 32 seats on a massive 15.2% swing to the UAP.

The two Labor factions would not reunite until 1936.

Results

House of Representatives

Results by electorate

Senate

Results by electorate

Seats changing hands 

 Members listed in italics did not contest their seat at this election.

See also
 Candidates of the Australian federal election, 1931
 Members of the Australian House of Representatives, 1931–1934
 Members of the Australian Senate, 1932–1935

Notes
Notes

References

Further reading
 Cook, Peter. "Labor and the Premiers' Plan." Labour History (1969): 97–110. in JSTOR
 Denning, Warren, and Alan Douglas Reid. Caucus crisis: the rise & fall of the Scullin government (Hale & Iremonger, 1982)
 Head, Brian. "Economic crisis and political legitimacy: the 1931 federal election." Journal of Australian Studies (1978) 2#3 pp: 14-29. online
 Richardson, Nick. "The 1931 Australian Federal Election—Radio Makes History." Historical Journal of Film, Radio and Television (2010) 30#3 pp: 377-389. DOI:10.1080/01439685.2010.505037
 Roberts, Stephen H. "The Crisis in Australia: September, 1930-January, 1932." Pacific Affairs (1932) 5#4 pp: 319-332. in JSTOR
 Robinson, Geoff. "The Australian class structure and Australian politics 1931-40." APSA 2008: Australasian Political Science Association 2008 Conference. Australasian Political Science Association, 2008. online
 Robertson, J. R. "Scullin as Prime Minister: seven critical decisions." Labour History (1969): 27–36. in JSTOR
 Robertson, John. J.H. Scullin: A political biography (University of Western Australia Press, 1974)

References
University of WA  election results in Australia since 1890
Two-party-preferred vote since 1919

Federal elections in Australia
1931 elections in Australia
December 1931 events